Pollard's rho algorithm for logarithms is an algorithm introduced by John Pollard in 1978 to solve the discrete logarithm problem, analogous to Pollard's rho algorithm to solve the integer factorization problem.

Solutions to this equation are easily obtained using the extended Euclidean algorithm.

Algorithm

Let  be a cyclic group of order , and given , and a partition , let  be the map 

 input: a: a generator of G
        b: an element of G
 output: An integer x such that ax = b, or failure
 
 Initialise a0 ← 0, b0 ← 0, x0 ← 1 ∈ G
 
 i ← 1
 loop
     xi ← f(xi-1), 
     ai ← g(xi-1, ai-1), 
     bi ← h(xi-1, bi-1)
 
     x2i ← f(f(x2i-2)), 
     a2i ← g(f(x2i-2), g(x2i-2, a2i-2)), 
     b2i ← h(f(x2i-2), h(x2i-2, b2i-2))
 
     if xi = x2i then
         r ← bi - b2i
         if r = 0 return failure
         x ← r−1(a2i - ai) mod n
         return x
     else // xi ≠ x2i
         i ← i + 1
     end if
 end loop

Example
The algorithm is implemented by the following C++ program:

#include <stdio.h>

const int n = 1018, N = n + 1;  /* N = 1019 -- prime     */
const int alpha = 2;            /* generator             */
const int beta = 5;             /* 2^{10} = 1024 = 5 (N) */

void new_xab(int& x, int& a, int& b) {
  switch (x % 3) {
  case 0: x = x * x     % N;  a =  a*2  % n;  b =  b*2  % n;  break;
  case 1: x = x * alpha % N;  a = (a+1) % n;                  break;
  case 2: x = x * beta  % N;                  b = (b+1) % n;  break;
  }
}

int main(void) {
  int x = 1, a = 0, b = 0;
  int X = x, A = a, B = b;
  for (int i = 1; i < n; ++i) {
    new_xab(x, a, b);
    new_xab(X, A, B);
    new_xab(X, A, B);
    printf("%3d  %4d %3d %3d  %4d %3d %3d\n", i, x, a, b, X, A, B);
    if (x == X) break;
  }
  return 0;
}

The results are as follows (edited):

  i     x   a   b     X   A   B
 ------------------------------
  1     2   1   0    10   1   1
  2    10   1   1   100   2   2
  3    20   2   1  1000   3   3
  4   100   2   2   425   8   6
  5   200   3   2   436  16  14
  6  1000   3   3   284  17  15
  7   981   4   3   986  17  17
  8   425   8   6   194  17  19
 ..............................
 48   224 680 376    86 299 412
 49   101 680 377   860 300 413
 50   505 680 378   101 300 415
 51  1010 681 378  1010 301 416

As  is not prime, there is another solution , for which  holds.

Complexity

References

Logarithms
Number theoretic algorithms